Admiral Andrews may refer to:

Adolphus Andrews (1879–1948), U.S. Navy vice admiral
Annie B. Andrews (born 1959), U.S. Navy rear admiral
Philip Andrews (admiral) (1866–1935), U.S. Navy vice admiral

See also
William Andrewes (1899–1974), British Royal Navy admiral